Palinganatham is a village in the Ariyalur taluk of Ariyalur district, Tamil Nadu, India.

Demographics 

 census, Palinganatham-621651 had a total population of 3955 with 1969 males and 1986 females.

References 

Villages in Ariyalur district